Diego Moyano (born 14 March 1975) is a coach and former professional tennis player from Argentina. Currently he is coaching WTA tennis pro Coco Gauff. Prior to that he coached Kevin Anderson from 2020 until his retirement in May 2022.
Moyano previously worked as a USTA coach, training American ATP players Tommy Paul and Reilly Opelka, as well as helping Denis Kudla and Andrea Collarini.

Career
Moyano took part in the 1999 French Open and lost a four set opening round match to American player Chris Woodruff.

His next appearance on the ATP Tour was in the 2001 Cerveza Club Colombia Open, where he was unable to get past qualifier Alexandre Simoni in the first round. He was also an opening round casualty at his next ATP tournament, the 2004 Buenos Aires Open, losing to Óscar Hernández.

The Argentine played in the doubles at the 2003 BellSouth Open, with Phillip Harboe. They lost in the first round to José Acasuso and Andrés Schneiter.

ATP Challenger and ITF Futures finals

Singles: 27 (10–17)

Doubles: 9 (3–6)

References

External links

Diego Moyano at the Association of Tennis Professionals Coach profile

1975 births
Living people
Argentine male tennis players
Tennis players from Buenos Aires